José Eulogio Gárate Ormaechea (born 20 September 1944) is a former professional footballer who played as a striker for SD Eibar, SD Indautxu and Atlético Madrid. Born in Argentina, he represented the Spain national team at international level.

Club career
Gárate was born to Basque parents in Argentina and grew up in Eibar, Spain. He began his career with SD Eibar in 1960 before joining SD Indautxu in 1963. Just like two earlier Indautxu players, Chus Pereda and Miguel Jones, he was controversially overlooked by Athletic Bilbao and like Jones he eventually joined Atlético Madrid. Along with Luis Aragonés, Adelardo, Javier Irureta, Enrique Collar, and Ufarte, he was a prominent member of the successful Atlético side of the late 1960s and early 1970s. Gárate helped the team win La Liga three times, the Copa del Generalísimo twice, reach the final of the European Cup and win the Intercontinental Cup. He was a notable goalscorer, winning the Pichichi three times in a row between 1968 and 1970 and scoring the winning goals in the 1972 and 1976 Copa del Generalísimo finals. During his time at Atlético, Gárate played 241 games and scored 135 goals.

International career
Gárate also played 18 times for Spain and scored 5 goals. He made his debut on 22 October 1967 against Czechoslovakia and played his last game against Romania on 17 April 1975. During this period Spain failed to qualify for either the European Championships or World Cup, and as a result he never played in the finals of a major international competition.

Career statistics

Club

International
Scores and results list Spain's goal tally first, score column indicates score after each Gárate goal.

Honours
 Atlético Madrid
Intercontinental Cup: 1974
Spanish League: 1969–70, 1972–73, 1976–77
Spanish Cup: 1971–72, 1975–76
Pichichi Trophy: 1968–69, 1969–70, 1970–71

See also
List of Spain international footballers born outside Spain

References

External links
 
 National team data 
 

1944 births
Living people
Sportspeople from Avellaneda
Spanish footballers
Spain international footballers
Spain under-23 international footballers
Spain amateur international footballers
Footballers from Eibar
Argentine footballers
Argentine people of Basque descent
Argentine emigrants to Spain
Citizens of Spain through descent
La Liga players
Atlético Madrid footballers
SD Eibar footballers
Pichichi Trophy winners
SD Indautxu footballers
Association football forwards